"The '80s Called" is a television advertisement produced by GSD&M for RadioShack, which debuted during Super Bowl XLVIII on February 2, 2014.

Plot
A RadioShack store clerk (Mark Saul) receives a call and informs his coworker that "The '80s called. They want their store back." Seconds later, several 1980s pop culture icons raid the store and clear the inventory while Loverboy's "Working for the Weekend" plays in the background. The icons then load their loot on a DeLorean and leave the empty store.

Featured pop culture icons

ALF
Bubo
The California Raisins
Chucky
Cliff Clavin (John Ratzenberger)
Devo
Slim Goodbody
Hulk Hogan
Kid 'n Play
Frank "Ponch" Poncherello (Erik Estrada)
Q*bert
Mary Lou Retton
Sgt. Slaughter
Slimer
Dee Snider
Teen Wolf
Jason Voorhees

References

2014 works
2010s television commercials
Fiction set in the 1980s
RadioShack
Super Bowl commercials